The Global Investigative Journalism Network (GIJN) is "an international association of nonprofit organizations that support, promote and produce investigative journalism." The association is headquartered in the United States, and its membership is open to "nonprofits, NGOs, and educational organizations" that are active in investigative reporting and data journalism. As of February 2021, GIJN had 203 member organizations in 76 countries.

The organisation’s projects include a help desk to provide investigative journalists with advice and assistance, a resource center with tips, tools, and manuals, and large training conferences that have attracted over 5,000 journalists from 100 countries.

History
GIJN was formed in 2003 as a loose network in support of the biennial Global Investigative Journalism Conference (GIJC), which had been launched two years earlier by veteran journalists Brant Houston and Nils Mulvad. The GIJN secretariat was officially formed after participants of the 7th GIJC in Kiev voted for the formation of a provisional secretariat in 2013. The organization registered as a nonprofit corporation in Maryland, United States of America, in 2014 and was approved as a 501(c)(3) nonprofit organization by the U.S. Internal Revenue Service in October 2014.

Members
Member organizations include the Center for Investigative Reporting, Investigative Reporters and Editors (IRE), International Consortium of Investigative Journalism (ICIJ), Organized Crime and Corruption Reporting Project (OCCRP), Arab Reporters for Investigative Journalism (ARIJ), Brazilian Association of Investigative Journalism, Investigative Journalism Programme at Wits University, Philippine Center for Investigative Journalism, ProPublica, Journalism for Nation Building Foundation-Philippines, and Interlink Academy for International Dialog and Journalism.

Global Investigative Journalism Conference (GIJC)
GIJN co-organizes a biennial Global Investigative Journalism Conference (GIJC), to bring together investigative journalists across the globe to share their knowledge and expertise with each other and to form cross-border networks for collaborative reporting and referrals.

The GIJC has been held in Copenhagen in 2001 and 2003, Amsterdam (2005), Toronto (2007), Lillehammer (2008), Geneva (2010), Kiev (2011), Rio de Janeiro (2013), Lillehammer (2015), and Johannesburg (2017). The latest conference was held in Hamburg, Germany in 2019.

Since 2014, GIJN has organized investigative journalism conferences in Asia. The first Asian Investigative Journalism Conference was held in Manila (2014), the second in Kathmandu (2016), and the third in Seoul (2018).

Global Shining Light Award
GIJN gives out Global Shining Light Awards for excellence in investigative reporting "in a developing or transitioning country, done under threat, duress, or in the direst of conditions."

The awards are presented to recipients in an awards ceremony held every two years at its biennial GIJC events. Past recipients include the Organized Crime and Corruption Reporting Project (OCCRP), Khadija Ismayilova from Radio Free Europe/Radio Liberty, and Sonali Samarasinghe from The Sunday Leader.

References

External links
 Global Investigative Journalism Network
GIJN's entry at The Investigative Journalism Education Consortium

Charities based in Maryland
Investigative journalism
News agencies based in the United States
International journalism organizations